This is a list of diplomatic missions in Turkmenistan.  At present, the capital city, Ashgabat, hosts 32 embassies and 6 other missions with diplomatic status, including one bilateral mission, two international financial institutions, and three multilateral missions.

Embassies

Ashgabat

Missions with diplomatic status
ADB (Mission)
 EBRD (Representative Office)
 (Delegation)
 (Economic Bureau)
 OSCE (Mission)
 (Mission)

Consulates

Mary

Turkmenbashy

Non-resident embassies
Resident in Ankara, Turkey:

Resident in Baku, Azerbaijan:

Resident in Moscow, Russia:

Resident in Astana, Kazakhstan:

Resident in Tehran, Iran:

Resident elsewhere:

 (Tashkent)
 (Helsinki)
 (New York City)
 (Tashkent) 
 (New Delhi)
 (Valletta)
 (Kiev)
 (Tashkent)
 (Stockholm)

See also
 Foreign relations of Turkmenistan

Notes

References

Links 
 Diplomatic representations of foreign states and international organizations accredited in Turkmenistan (Ministry of Foreign Affairs) (accessed 1 April 2021)
 Missions in Turkmenistan (US Embassy in Turkmenistan website)
 States with which Turkmenistan has established diplomatic relations (in Russian)

 
Turkmenistan
Diplomatic missions
Diplomatic missions